Ion Ibrian is a Moldovan footballer who plays for Bradford Park Avenue, as a forward.

Club career
On 26 November 2016, Ibrian made his professional debut with Zimbru Chișinău in a 2016–17 Divizia Națională match against Sheriff Tiraspol.

On 19 November 2020, Ibrian joined English National League North club Bradford Park Avenue.

References

External links
  
Ion Ibrian at uefa.com

Notes

1998 births
Living people
Moldovan footballers
Moldovan expatriate footballers
FC Spicul Chișcăreni players
FC Zimbru Chișinău players
Speranța Nisporeni players
FC Milsami Orhei players
FC Codru Lozova players
Bradford (Park Avenue) A.F.C. players
Moldovan Super Liga players
Association football forwards
Moldovan expatriate sportspeople in England
Expatriate footballers in England
Real Succes Chișinău players